Acrobasis eva is a species of snout moth in the genus Acrobasis, found on Sumatra. It was described by Roesler and Küppers, in 1981.

References

Moths described in 1981
Acrobasis
Moths of Asia